The United Kingdom First Party was a small short-lived populist, Eurosceptic British political party, founded in 2009.  It fielded candidates in three English regions for the 2009 European parliamentary elections: the East Midlands, the East of England and the South East.

The party agreed to work with the Popular Alliance during the election, in order to achieve the two parties' goals, with both parties saying they had similar backgrounds and goals.

It disbanded in 2010 after its failure in the European parliamentary elections. It was voluntarily deregistered in April 2010.

Policies
The party placed its opposition to British membership of the European Union in the context of a desire to reduce "the cost, the scope and the number of layers of government". It set out a brief summary of its policies, with an undertaking to develop them further after the European elections, influenced by the outcome, towards simpler taxation, smaller Government and less centralisation.

The party also claimed to believe in freedom for Britain to negotiate its own trade deals individually or as part of a trade bloc, free speech, and the ability to hold politicians to account through referendums.

European Parliament election, 2009

Candidates for the European Parliament in 2009 included the journalist and former presenter of One Man and His Dog, Robin Page, and the former UK Independence Party chairman Petrina Holdsworth.

The candidates pledged to serve only one term, not to employ family members, to publish their accounts and refuse invitations to "sit on committees of the European Parliament nor attend the plenaries in Brussels and Strasbourg except in the case of a vote which the party leadership regards as of critical importance to British interests".

At the 2009 European election, UK First received 74,000 votes - 0.5% of the national vote - and none of its candidates were elected.

MEP candidate list, 2009

See also
 Alliance for Democracy

External links
UK First Party

References

Political parties established in 2009
Eurosceptic parties in the United Kingdom
2009 establishments in the United Kingdom